"The Day We Find Love" is a song by English boy band 911. It was released in the United Kingdom through Virgin Records on 10 February 1997 as the fourth single from their debut studio album, The Journey (1997). The song debuted at number four on the UK Singles Chart.

Track listings
UK CD1, European and US CD single
 "The Day We Find Love" (radio edit)
 "Don't Make Me Wait" (Top-Tastic mix)
 "Night to Remember" (One World edit)

UK CD2
 "The Day We Find Love" (radio edit)
 "The Day We Find Love" (extended mix)
 "The Day We Find Love" (swing mix)

UK cassette single
 "The Day We Find Love" (radio edit)
 "The Day We Find Love" (extended mix)

Charts

References

1997 singles
1997 songs
911 (English group) songs
Song recordings produced by Eliot Kennedy
Songs written by Eliot Kennedy
Virgin Records singles